The Scottish Short Film Festival was an independent film festival which has taken place annually in Scotland from 2012 to 2022. From 2012 to 2017, the festival was known as The Raptor Filmz Short Scottish Film Festival until the event was rebranded in 2018.

History and format

The festival was set up in 2012 by Scottish filmmaker Chris Young who is the company director of Raptor Filmz Ltd in West Lothian. The aim of the festival is to promote short Scottish films with a view of potentially setting up a distribution deal with filmmakers. The first festival took place in Glasgow at the Grosvenor Cinema and was hosted by Scottish actor David Anderson. With a desire to bring the festival closer to home, the festival was moved to the Howden  Park Centre in Livingston where the date of the festival was also moved to January 2014 rather than December 2013. In 2015, the festival found a new home at the Bathgate Regal Community Theatre which is operated by Scottish actor Scott Kyle. Speaking of the Regal, festival curator Chris Young said:

The festival consists of awards for films and individual prizes. The awards are selected by jury with an audience choice award being decided by visitors of the festival. Jury members in the past have included actor Declan Michael Laird and film editor Chris Quick. In 2018, it was announced that Ross Miller, the film critic for The National newspaper would join the judging panel.

The festival returned in 2018 but under the new name of The Scottish Short Film Festival. The Centre for Contemporary Arts in Glasgow was due to host the 2018 festival but due to the fire at the Glasgow School of Art, the venue was forced to close. It was announced on the festival's Twitter account that the Crowne Plaza Glasgow would take over as host.

On 4 November 2022, it was announced on the festivals website that the 2022 edition of the festival would be its last. The message on the website read:

Festival award winners
List of winners and nominees of the festival.

2012 winners

2014 winners

2015 winners

2016 winners

2017 winners

The Golden Raptor Award - Portrait of the Artwork as a Young Man - Chris Gerrard
Judges 1st Prize - Writer's Block
Judges 2nd Prize - Enora
Audience Choice Award (Evening Session) - Dying To Forgive
Audience Choice Award (Afternoon Session) - Weekend Away

2018 winners

The Golden Raptor Award - Carved - Daniel Caradec
Judges 1st Prize - Lethe - Eric Romero
Judges 2nd Prize - To The Sea - Mark Westbrook & R. Paul Wilson
Audience Choice Award - Drone - Robert Duncan
Rising Star Award - To The Sea - Gregor Selkirk
Golden Bawhair - The She Wolves Of Wall Street - Tamsin Amantea-Collins

2019 winners

The Golden Raptor Award - Remember Me - Katie Low
Judges 1st Prize - Turning Tide - Andrew Muir
Judges 2nd Prize - Spaceship - Conor McMahon
Judges 3rd Prize - Mess - Graham Robertson
Main Event Audience Choice Award - Spaceship - Conor McMahon
Matinee Audience Award - Turning The Tables - Jay Rowan Tanner
Golden Raptor Award - Remember Me - Katie Low

2020 Winners
Audience Choice Award - Eyes Down

2021 Winners
Audience Choice Award - Last House on CCTV

2022 Winners
Audience Choice Award (Saturday Screening) - 1815 - Neil Boyle
Audience Choice Award (Sunday Screening) - Terminal Happiness - Eric Romero
Judges 1st Prize - 1815 - Neil Boyle
Judges 2nd Prize - Whale Heart - Phillip Edge
Golden Raptor Award - Professor Heny Bowfax's Fantastic Journey Through Time!

References

External links
The Scottish Short Film Festival Official Website
Festival IMDB Page
Festival Filmfreeway Page
Festival 2016 Trailer

Short film festivals in the United Kingdom
Film festivals established in 2012
Edinburgh Festival
Film festivals in Glasgow
Film festivals in Edinburgh
2012 establishments in Scotland
Defunct film festivals
Defunct film festivals in the United Kingdom